Loket is a town of in Sokolov District in the Karlovy Vary Region of the Czech Republic. It has about 3,100 inhabitants. The town is known for the Loket Castle, a 12th-century Gothic castle. The historic town centre is well preserved and is protected by law as urban monument reservation.

Administrative parts
Villages of Dvory, Nadlesí and Údolí are administrative parts of Loket.

Etymology

Both Loket and Elbogen mean "elbow" in Czech and German, respectively. The town got its name due to the town centre being surrounded on three sides by the Ohře River, and the shape the river takes is similar to that of an elbow.

Geography
It lies mostly in the Slavkov Forest, only the northwestern part of the town extends into the Sokolov Basin. The Ohře River flows through the town.

History
In the second half of the 12th century, a royal castle Loket was built on a landmark promontory within the Ohře River bend. It used to be called the "Key to the Kingdom of Bohemia". Soon after, a small town, first mentioned in 1234, arose below the castle.

In the early 15th century the royal town was fortified and turned into an important focal point of the Bohemian Crown. In the course of the 19th century, the town became famous for its local porcelain factory. However, industrial production was located in the surrounding towns.

The town was part of the Austrian Empire until 1918, in the Falkenau 18th district (one of the 94 "Bezirkshauptmannschaften" in Bohemia).

From 1938 to 1945 it was one of the municipalities in Sudetenland. In 1945 the German population was expelled according to the Beneš decrees. In the late 20th century, the castle underwent a complete reconstruction and was subsequently open to the public.

Demographics

Culture
Loket hosts an annual opera festival, which takes place in an open-air amphitheatre with the castle as a backdrop. The festival, called Loketské kulturní léto ("Loket Cultural Summer"), was established in 2000. The amphitheatre has a capacity of 1,800 seated spectators.

Sport
Loket hosts the annual Czech Motocross Grand Prix.

Sights

The most visited historical monument in the town is Romanesque Loket Castle. In the days of the House of Luxembourg, the castle served as a temporary residence of members of the royal family. During the Thirty Years' War it was conquered and plundered by Swedish troops. The abandoned castle burned down in 1725, and was rebuilt into a regional jail in 1822.

In popular culture
Loket was used, in conjunction with Karlovy Vary, to portray a Montenegrin town in the 2006 James Bond film Casino Royale.

Loket fielded an assignment at Loket Castle and Svatoš rocks during the finale of the 21st season of the Dutch reality television series Wie is de Mol?.

Notable people
Ferdinand Pfohl (1862–1949), German music critic and composer
Wolfgang von Schwind (1879–1949), Austrian actor and opera singer

Twin towns – sister cities

Loket is twinned with:
 Illertissen, Germany

References

External links

Tourist Information Centre

Cities and towns in the Czech Republic
Populated places in Sokolov District